Rajmund Badó (15 August 1902 – 26 December 1997) was a Hungarian wrestler who competed in the 1924 Summer Olympics and the 1928 Summer Olympics. At the 1924 Summer Olympics, he won the bronze medal in the Greco-Roman wrestling heavyweight class.

References

External links
 

1902 births
1997 deaths
Olympic wrestlers of Hungary
Wrestlers at the 1924 Summer Olympics
Wrestlers at the 1928 Summer Olympics
Hungarian male sport wrestlers
Olympic bronze medalists for Hungary
Olympic medalists in wrestling
Medalists at the 1924 Summer Olympics
Sport wrestlers from Budapest
20th-century Hungarian people